The women's discus throw event at the 2009 Asian Athletics Championships was held at the Guangdong Olympic Stadium on November 13.

Results

References
Results

2009 Asian Athletics Championships
Discus throw at the Asian Athletics Championships
2009 in women's athletics